Rhodri Glyn Thomas (born 11 April 1953) is a Welsh politician. He was the Plaid Cymru National Assembly for Wales Member for Carmarthen East and Dinefwr from 1999 to 2016, when he did not re-stand for election. Following his retirement from the Assembly he was appointed President of the National Library of Wales.

Education
Thomas was born in Wrexham, Denbighshire.  He attended Ysgol Bodhyfryd, Wrexham, and then Ysgol Morgan Llwyd, Wrexham before leaving for the University of Wales, Aberystwyth in 1975 to study for a BA degree in Welsh and Education in 1975. After graduating, he studied for a BD degree in Theology at the University of Wales, Bangor and Bala-Bangor Theological Seminary under R. Tudur Jones. In 1991 he studied for a MTh degree at the University of Wales, Lampeter, reading American Theology although the final thesis he submitted was on the Union of Welsh Independents (Undeb yr Annibynwyr Cymraeg) role in the struggle to revive the Welsh Language in the 20th century.

Professional career
Thomas is a Minister of Religion, the director of a language consultancy, a former Chair of CND Cymru and Welsh spokesperson for the Forum of Private Business.

Political career
In 1992, Thomas fought the old Carmarthen constituency in the General Election for Plaid Cymru - Party of Wales. In the 1997 General Election he stood for Plaid Cymru in Carmarthen East & Dinefwr. In 1999 he fought the same constituency in the National Assembly Elections, winning by 6,980 votes. He was reelected in 2007 with an increased majority of over 8,000 making it the Assembly's second safest seat.  Plaid Cymru entered into a coalition government with Welsh Labour in July 2007, and Rhodri Glyn Thomas was appointed as Minister for Heritage (19 July 2007), which he resigned from in July 2008 after walking into a Cardiff pub with a lit cigar, thus breaking the law.

In November 2008, having travelled to the Gaza Strip alongside other European politicians, Thomas called for the international community to talk to the Palestinian group Hamas. "I can see no chance of peace in the Middle East until a dialogue is opened with Hamas," he said. "Since the election, Israel has imprisoned around 30 Hamas MPs. Whatever you think about their stance, the fact is they were democratically elected in an election which had a very high turnout and whose results were validated by international observers. The Israeli position is that Hamas are terrorists, but it isn’t that long ago that Nelson Mandela was described as a terrorist by Margaret Thatcher."

In December 2016 Thomas announced that he would stand as a candidate for election to Carmarthenshire County Council, contesting the St Clears ward. However, he was heavily defeated at the election by the sitting Independent councillor.

Wales Book of the Year error
At the Academi  2008 Wales Book of the Year ceremony, Thomas incorrectly announced that Tom Bullough was the winner. The prize was, in fact, awarded to Dannie Abse, Thomas having read the card wrongly.

References

External links
Senedd profile
Rhodri Glyn Thomas AM website
Rhodri Glyn Thomas AM blog
Plaid Cymru - the Party of Wales website
Cigar blunder minister quits job

Offices held

1953 births
Living people
Plaid Cymru politicians
Plaid Cymru members of the Senedd
Wales AMs 1999–2003
Wales AMs 2003–2007
Wales AMs 2007–2011
Wales AMs 2011–2016
Members of the Welsh Assembly Government
Alumni of the University of Wales, Lampeter
Alumni of Bangor University
Alumni of Aberystwyth University
Welsh Protestant ministers and clergy
Welsh Congregationalists
Welsh-speaking politicians
Calvinist pacifists
People from Wrexham
People educated at Ysgol Morgan Llwyd